Jonas Müller (born 4 October 1997) is an Austrian luger.

He participated at the 2019 FIL World Luge Championships, winning the gold medal in the sprint.

On 24 November 2019 Muller won the opening men's luge singles event of the FIL 2019-20 Luge World Cup season in Innsbruck.  The next week in the next luge world cup event at Lake Placid Muller again took first place in the men's singles event and remained the World Cup leader.

References

External links

1997 births
Living people
Austrian male lugers
People from Bludenz
Sportspeople from Vorarlberg